Krasnensky District is an administrative district (raion), one of the twenty-one in Belgorod Oblast, Russia. Municipally, it is incorporated as Krasnensky Municipal District. It is located in the northeast of the oblast. Its administrative center is the rural locality (a selo) of Krasnoye. Population:   15,337 (2002 Census). The population of Krasnoye accounts for 16.1% of the district's total population.

History
The district was established in February 1991.

References

Notes

Sources

Districts of Belgorod Oblast
 

